Run to Ruin is the third album by American singer-songwriter Nina Nastasia. It was recorded by Steve Albini at Black Box studio in Noyant-la-Gravoyère, France and at Looking Glass studio in New York. Released in 2003 by Touch and Go Records, it received universal critical acclaim according to Metacritic with a composite rating of 85, ranking 29th among the best albums of 2003.

Track listing
All songs written and composed by Nina Nastasia.

The Japanese edition of the album features a hidden ghost track placed at the end of the album. The original version of album closer "While We Talk" is followed by several minutes of silence when, at 8:33, an alternate version of the track sung by Nastasia in Japanese begins. The backing track to this Japanese version of "While We Talk" (written in rōmaji as "Simpuru Ni"; which translates literally as "Simpler Thoughts") is identical to the English version, with the exception of some barely audible additional instrumentation (chamberlin and optigan). The Japanese translation for the lyric was provided by Daisuke Miyake, with new instrumentation performed and recorded by Paul Bryan.

Recording information
Nina Nastasia – Acoustic Guitar, Electric Guitar, Vocals
Mr. Steven Beck – Piano
Joshua Carlebach – Accordion, Piano
Stephen Day – Cello
Anne Mette Iversen – Upright Bass
Gerry Leonard – Guitar, Hammer Dulcimer, Banjo
Dave Richards – Electric Bass
Jim White – Drums
Dylan Willemsa – Viola, Violin

Recorded by Steve Albini.

References

2003 albums
Albums produced by Steve Albini
Touch and Go Records albums
Nina Nastasia albums